is a temple of the Jōdo Shinshū (Pure Land) school of Buddhism. It is located in Takachiho Town, Miyazaki, on Kyūshū, Japan's southernmost main island.

The Shonen-ji temple complex is situated at the base of Genbuzan mountain, about 12 km outside central Takachiho. It was established there in 1578 by Tanio Yoshimura following the destruction of Genbu-jo, the Yoshimura clan's castle. Genbu-jo was burned and the principal Yoshimura family members killed when the Christian daimyō, Ōtomo Sōrin, invaded from Bungo Province in the north. According to temple records, Tanio Yoshimura experienced a revelation following the loss of the castle and then committed himself and his successors to a religious life in atonement for the many deaths that had occurred.

In accordance with Jōdo Shinshū tradition, the position of head priest at Shonen-ji is hereditary through the eldest son. The present head priest, Junsho Yoshimura (b. 1958), is the seventeenth generation of his family to serve at Shonen-ji. Shonen-ji is unique (June 2011) among Japanese temples in that the English wife of the head priest is herself an ordained Kiyoshi (senior priest).

In May 2006, Shonen-ji established a branch temple in the Kishinoue section of central Takachiho. The Kishinoue Kaikan (see image below) includes a meeting hall, a mausoleum, and an English school.

Principal buildings

Takachiho-cho 
 A  stands at the main entrance to the temple. In 1978, a new bell was installed to mark the 400th anniversary of Shonen-ji's founding. The tower itself was rebuilt as a 3x2 ken (bay) structure in 1986.
Shonen-ji's  measures 7x7 ken (bays). The hall has been destroyed by fire twice in its history. The present structure dates from the early 20th century.
Nokotsu-dō (Mausoleum) 3x2 ken
Kaikan (Meeting Hall). Opened in December 2000.
Community Hall

Central Takachiho 
Kishinoue Kaikan (Branch temple, mausoleum, and English school) in the Kishinoue section of central Takachiho.

Gallery

See also 
Takachiho Town
Amanoiwato-jinja - Shinto shrine

References

Further reading

External links 

Shonen-ji Temple, Takachiho - Official Site 
Jodo Shinshu Hongwanji-ha - Official Site 
Takachiho Tourism Site 

Buddhist temples in Miyazaki Prefecture
Pure Land Buddhism
Pure Land temples